Jenny Haddon (born 1933 in London, England) is a British writer of over 45 romance novels for Mills & Boon. who writes as Sophie Weston and Sophie Page. She is also a member of the Committee of the U.K.'s Romantic Novelists' Association (R.N.A.), and was elected its twenty-third Chair (2005–2007).

Biography
Haddon was born on 1933 in London, England. She studied English Language and Literature at university. She worked as consultant at the Bank of England.

Haddon published romantic novels since under the pseudonym Sophie Weston. She is an active member of the Romantic Novelists' Association's Committee, and was elected its twenty-third Chair from 2005 to 2007.

Haddon lives in her house with one cat and innumerous books..

Bibliography

As Sophie Weston

Single Novels

The Notting Hill Grooms Trilogy Multi-Author
3. The Millionaire Affair (1999)

Bride Doll Series Multi-Author
 Midnight Wedding (2000)

The Carew Stepsisters Series
 The Millionaire's Daughter (2001)
 The Bridesmaid's Secret (2001)

The Wedding Challenge Trilogy
 The Independent Bride (2003)
 The Accidental Mistress (2003)
 The Duke's Proposal (2004)

Omnibus in Collaboration
 Sycamore Song / Autumn Concerto / Beware the Huntsman (1980) (with Elizabeth Hunter and Rebecca Stratton)
 Once Bitten, Twice Shy / Love's Sting / The Wedding Effect (1996) (with Catherine Spencer)
 Desert Desires (2002) (with Barbara McMahon)
 Hot Latin Lovers (2003) (with Sara Craven and Michelle Reid)

As Sophie Page

Single Novels
To Marry a Prince (2011)

References

External links
 Jenny Haddon's Official Website
 Sophie Weston's Official Website
 The Romantic Novelists' Association's Website
 Sophie Weston's Webpage in Fantastic Fiction's Website

1933 births
Living people
English romantic fiction writers
English women novelists
Writers from London
Women romantic fiction writers